Sisquoc (Chumash for "quail") is a census-designated place in Santa Barbara County, California located east of U.S. Route 101 about  southeast of Santa Maria and  south of Garey. The ZIP Code is 93454, and the community is inside area code 805. Sisquoc has a fire station, a church, a Preschool-8 school and a store. It has a micro-climate with mild weather year-round. The population was 183 at the 2010 census.

The town is at the intersection of Palmer Road and Foxen Canyon Road, at the southwestern edge of the floodplain of the Sisquoc River.  The predominant land use on the plain is agriculture, while the hills to the south and west contain the Cat Canyon Oil Field, with Greka Energy and ERG Resources, LLC being the largest operators.

Sisquoc is an agricultural area. It is well known for vineyards and strawberry fields. The terrain is hilly, and there are mountains in the distance. Wildlife near Sisquoc includes bobcats, coyotes, mountain lions, rabbits, and gophers.

There is one closed store in town called the Sisquoc store, and a fire station. There is one school in town called Benjamin Foxen, home of the Bobcats.  Benjamin Foxen is the only remaining school of 5 in the Blochman School District.  The Blochman School PTA (Parent Teacher Association) was established in 1960. The school has a library in need of more books. Students and teachers at Blochman run a school garden, and fresh produce from the garden is served in the cafeteria.

Geography
According to the United States Census Bureau, the CDP covers an area of 2.2 square miles (5.8 km), 99.82% of it land, and 0.18% of it water.

Demographics
The 2010 United States Census reported that Sisquoc had a population of 183. The racial makeup of Sisquoc was 146 (79.8%) White, 0 (0.0%) African American, 5 (2.7%) Native American, 3 (1.6%) Asian, 0 (0.0%) Pacific Islander, 9 (4.9%) from other races, and 20 (10.9%) from two or more races. Hispanic or Latino of any race were 58 persons (31.7%).

The Census reported that 183 people (100% of the population) lived in households, 0 (0%) lived in non-institutionalized group quarters, and 0 (0%) were institutionalized.

There were 69 households, out of which 26 (37.7%) had children under the age of 18 living in them, 38 (55.1%) were opposite-sex married couples living together, 6 (8.7%) had a female householder with no husband present, 3 (4.3%) had a male householder with no wife present.  There were 4 (5.8%) unmarried opposite-sex partnerships, and 1 (1.4%) same-sex married couples or partnerships. 14 households (20.3%) were made up of individuals, and 5 (7.2%) had someone living alone who was 65 years of age or older. The average household size was 2.65.  There were 47 families (68.1% of all households); the average family size was 3.00.

The population was spread out, with 49 people (26.8%) under the age of 18, 8 people (4.4%) aged 18 to 24, 44 people (24.0%) aged 25 to 44, 65 people (35.5%) aged 45 to 64, and 17 people (9.3%) who were 65 years of age or older.  The median age was 38.6 years. For every 100 females, there were 108.0 males.  For every 100 females age 18 and over, there were 97.1 males.

The homeowner vacancy rate was 2.3%; the rental vacancy rate was 0%.  98 people (53.6% of the population) lived in owner-occupied housing units and 85 people (46.4%) lived in rental housing units.

References

Census-designated places in Santa Barbara County, California
Census-designated places in California